Eddie Hughes may refer to:

 Eddie Hughes (basketball) (born 1960), American basketball player
 Eddie Hughes (Australian politician), Labor Member of the South Australian House of Assembly
 Eddie Hughes (British politician) (born 1968), Conservative MP for Walsall North

See also
 Edward Hughes (disambiguation)
 Ed Hughes (disambiguation)
 Hughes (surname)